The National Institutes of Health (NIH) is an agency of the United States Department of Health and Human Services and is the primary agency of the United States government responsible for biomedical and health-related research. It comprises 27 separate institutes and centers (ICs) that carry out its mission in different areas of biomedical research. It also includes the Office of the Director, which sets policies and coordinates activities of the 27 ICs.

Institutes

Centers of the NIH
In addition to being divided by research area, NIH has many operating groups called centers operating across all of the Institutes.

Office of the Director
The Office of the Director is the central office at NIH. The OD is responsible for setting policy for NIH and for planning, managing, and coordinating the programs and activities of all the NIH components. Program offices in the Office of the Director are responsible for stimulating specific areas of research throughout NIH and for planning and supporting research and related activities. Current program areas are: minority health, women's health, AIDS research, disease prevention, and behavioral and social sciences research. In July 2009, President Barack Obama nominated Dr. Francis S. Collins, M.D., PhD, to be the Director of the NIH. On August 7, 2009, the US Senate confirmed Collins by unanimous vote.

Program offices within the Office of the Director fund research through the institutes:

See also 
 List of Max Planck Institutes
 Center of Advanced European Studies and Research
 Ernst Strüngmann Institute
 List of IBS Centers

References

External links
 
 Institutes at NIH

National Institutes of Health
NIH
National Institutes of Health